The McClelland Trophy is an Australian rules football trophy which, since 2023, has been awarded each year to the combined Champion Club across the Australian Football League (AFL) and AFL Women's (AFLW) home-and-away seasons.

From 1951 to 2022, the Australian Football League (which was known prior to 1990 as the Victorian Football League) awarded the trophy to the best-performing club in the home-and-away season; until 1990, the Trophy was presented to the club with the highest aggregate points across the three grades of competition that were sanctioned by the VFL/AFL - seniors, Reserves and Under-19s - with senior wins carrying a higher value.

In 1991, the AFL announced that the Under-19s competition would be shut down at the end of the season, to be replaced with a separate Under-18s competition in Victoria with clubs unaffliated with the AFL (now known as the Talent League).  From 1991 to 2022, the Trophy was presented to the club that finished the AFL home-and-away season on top of the ladder, thus merging the Trophy with the minor premiership.

In 2023, the AFL announced that the trophy would henceforth be awarded to the team with the highest aggregate points across both the AFL and AFLW competitions, and that $1 million prize money would be awarded to the winning team.

The Trophy was first awarded in 1951, when it was awarded to Essendon, and the last season it was awarded to the club with the highest aggregate points across the three grades of competition was 1990, when it was awarded to Melbourne (McClelland's original club).

The first season that the Trophy was awarded to the AFL minor premiers was 1991, when it was awarded to the West Coast Eagles, while the last season it was awarded to the AFL minor premiers was 2022, when it was awarded to Geelong. 

Teams that win the trophy are given a simplified replica of the middle panel of the perpetual trophy, which features the AFL lettering and a round die cast of McClelland.

History

The award was instituted in 1951 and is named in honour of Dr. William C. McClelland, who at that time had reached 25 years' service as President of the Victorian Football League.  He had previously played 91 games for Melbourne in the VFA in 1894 and in the VFL from 1898-1904, playing in its 1900 premiership team, and captaining the club in 1901-1904. After retiring as a player, he served as a club delegate in 1905-1911, and then as club President from 1912-1926 (when he resigned to become VFL President).

Original three-grade format

From 1951 to 1990, the trophy was  presented to the club with the highest aggregate points across the three levels of VFL/AFL competition: seniors, Reserves and Under-19s. The points system in 1951-1953 had five points being awarded for a win in first grade (seniors), three points for a win in the 'seconds' (Reserves), and one point for a win in the 'thirds' (Under-19s). In the event of a drawn match, each team received half of the points.  

In 1954, the points system was amended, weighting results slightly more in favour of senior level success and eliminating half-points in drawn matches: seniors wins were now worth ten points, with Reserves wins being worth four points and Under-19s wins being worth two points.

The 1985 season was the only time that there were joint winners of the McClelland Trophy, with Hawthorn and Carlton both finishing the home-and-away season with 228 points. 

The Hawks were originally declared the winners via countback,  which separated the two clubs by just 0.5% (or less than five goals) over the course of the entire season.  However, less than a week later, the VFL rescinded this decision after it was discovered that the McClelland Trophy followed the rules of the Brownlow Medal, which had removed its countback system five years earlier: consequently, the Hawks and Blues were declared joint winners. 

The countback system was used for the McClelland Trophy once, in 1954, after Geelong and Melbourne finished tied on points: Geelong were declared the winners by virtue of having a higher percentage in the seniors.

Interstate award
In 1957, a unrelated trophy of the same name was struck to reward the best Victorian player in interstate matches played against South Australia. The inaugural winner was Peter Pianto, and evidence of the award being presented continued up until at least 1965, when Footscray defender David Darcy was awarded the trophy.

Dissolution of minor grades, trophy awarded to minor premiers

With the VFL's interstate expansion from 1987 and rebranding as the AFL, the three-grade format became problematic: while Sydney continued to field teams in all three grades following the club's relocation from South Melbourne in 1981, Brisbane had fielded a Reserves team from 1989 but not an Under-19s team, whereas WAFL and SANFL officials had rejected VFL/AFL proposals for West Coast and Adelaide to field teams in the Reserves and Under-19s.

Subsequently, the AFL announced that the Under-19s competition would be shut down at the end of the 1991 season, and the McClelland Trophy's criteria was changed: from 1991 to 2022, the Trophy was awarded to the team finishing on top of the AFL ladder at the end of the home-and-away season, thus merging the Trophy with the minor premiership.  

Despite this change, some newspapers continued to publish cumulative results of the McClelland Trophy across the three grades up until Round 8, while there was notable apathy throughout the league about the award's relevance. In the event, the dissolution of the AFL Under-19s competition, being replaced with a new Under-18s competition (the TAC Cup) featuring teams that were unaffilated with the AFL clubs, confirmed the format change. 

At the end of the 1999 season, the AFL Reserves competition was shut down, being replaced by alignments with the Victorian Football League and other state leagues, thus completing the league's shift to having each AFL club field one team.

AFL & AFLW Combined Champion Club 
In March 2023, the AFL Commission announced it had approved a proposal to incorporate the results from the AFL Women's (AFLW) competition into the awarding of the trophy, thus bringing an end to its 1991 format.

From the 2023 AFL and 2023 AFLW seasons, the trophy will be presented to the club with the highest aggregate points across the home-and-away seasons of both competitions, with the winning club also being awarded $1 million prizemoney to be shared between the players and the winning club; the distribution of these funds is to be determined by subsequent CBA negotiations with the AFLPA.

The points system for 2023 has four points being awarded for a win in the AFL home-and-away season, and eight points being awarded for a win in the AFLW home-and-away season (adjusted to reflect the AFLW's shorter season length). In the event of a drawn match, each team receives half of the points. The points system will be reviewed each year, based on changes in season length.

In the event that two or more clubs are tied on aggregate points at the conclusion of both seasons, the percentages in both competitions will be added together, and the club with the highest total percentage will win the trophy.

The trophy 
The trophy is a perpetual shield that is kept at AFL House. The original trophy features McClelland's head embossed in bronze on the centre of five panels of wood, where the names of each winning club is inscribed over the years. Clubs also receive a smaller one-panel replica of the trophy.

Significance 
The award has been relatively low-key, with no prize money until 2023, although in recent seasons there had been a private presentation to clubs released in video format on websites. 

Prior to 1991, there was no trophy for the team that qualified for the finals in first position as minor premiers, even though winning the minor premiership did come with some prestige - finishing on first on the ladder at the end of the home-and-away season ensures an advantageous draw in the AFL finals series, and is also part of the official records. 

In April 2018, following a suggestion by then AFL Commission boss Richard Goyder to boost the significance of the McClelland Trophy and recognise the achievement of finishing on top of the ladder, AFL chief executive officer Gillon McLachlan agreed to consider introducing prize money alongside the award for the 2019 season and beyond. However, any monetary winnings were not introduced until 2023.

List of winners

1951-1990: Three-grade format

1991-2022: AFL minor premiers

2023-present: AFL & AFLW Combined Champion Club

Trophy winners

1951-1990: Three-grade format 

 Brisbane and West Coast (who entered the VFL/AFL in 1987) are excluded from this table as they did not field a team in all three grades in 1987-1990.
Richmond won the trophy four times in succession in 1972-1975, the most consecutive of any club, and also won all three grades' premierships in 1973, the only club to accomplish the feat during this period.
Collingwood (1964–1966) and Hawthorn (1984–1986, including 1985 tied) both won the trophy three times in succession.
Thirteen of these 41 McClelland Trophy winners (1985 was a tie between Hawthorn and Carlton) went on to win the senior premiership in the same year.
20 of these 41 McClelland Trophy winners also won the senior minor premiership in the same year.

1991-2022: AFL minor premiers

 Trophy wins from 1951-1990 are excluded from this table as they are not directly equivalent to those since 1991 due to the change in format. 
 Essendon (1999-2001) and Port Adelaide (2002-2004) each won the trophy three years in succession.
 Eleven of these 32 McClelland Trophy winners went on to win the AFL premiership in the same year.

See also
List of AFL premiers
List of AFL minor premiers
List of AFL Women's premiers
List of AFL Women's minor premiers

References

Australian Football League awards
Awards established in 1951